Cletus Henry Patterson (March 18, 1902 – September 16, 1954) was a guard in the National Football League. He played with the Kenosha Maroons during the 1924 NFL season.
He was born in Wellsville, Ohio on March 8, 1902. He graduated from Wellsville High School in 1920 and attended Ohio University.

References

People from Wellsville, Ohio
Kenosha Maroons players
American football offensive guards
Ohio Bobcats football players
1902 births
1954 deaths